According to The Book of Mormon, Cumeni was one of four cities located generally southward of the city of Judea and other cities, and at a higher elevation than Zarahemla.

The Lamanites, led by their king Ammoron, a Zoramite by birth, took Cumeni and three other cities, Manti, Zeezrom, and Antiparah.. The Nephites kept spies about to make sure the Lamanites did not attack the cities to the north. But the Lamanites would not leave their fortifications, and they dared not attack the cities to the north, nor march down to Zarahemla, nor cross the head of Sidon over to Nephihah. After battles with Lamanites in other cities, the Nephites laid siege to Cumeni until the Lamanites surrendered the city.

References 

 The Book of Mormon: Another Testament of Jesus Christ, translated by Joseph Smith, Jr. (Salt Lake City, Utah: The Church of Jesus Christ of Latter-day Saints, 1981 [first edition, 1830]).

Book of Mormon places